Franz Keller (born 19 January 1945) was a West German nordic combined skier. At the 1968 Winter Olympics in Grenoble, he won the gold medal in the individual event. Keller also won a silver at the 1966 FIS Nordic World Ski Championships in the individual event and won the event at the Holmenkollen ski festival in 1967.

Keller received the Holmenkollen medal in 1973 (shared with Einar Bergsland and Ingolf Mork).

References

 - click Holmenkollmedaljen for downloadable pdf file 
 - click Vinnere for downloadable pdf file 

1945 births
Nordic combined skiers at the 1968 Winter Olympics
Nordic combined skiers at the 1972 Winter Olympics
Ski jumpers at the 1968 Winter Olympics
German male Nordic combined skiers
German male ski jumpers
Holmenkollen medalists
Holmenkollen Ski Festival winners
Living people
Olympic Nordic combined skiers of West Germany
Olympic ski jumpers of West Germany
Olympic medalists in Nordic combined
FIS Nordic World Ski Championships medalists in Nordic combined
Medalists at the 1968 Winter Olympics
Olympic gold medalists for West Germany
20th-century German people